Choose Life, Uvacharta Bachayim is a studio album of the Choose Life, Uvacharta Bachayim dramatic oratorio by composer Mona Lyn Reese and librettist Delores Dufner OSB, released by the San José Chamber Orchestra and Chorus in 2011.

Track listing

Cast
Layna Chianakas, mezzo-soprano – Adonai
Stephen Guggenheim, tenor – Lazar
Allison Charney, soprano  – Franziska
Kevin Nakatani, bass – Dives
Jordan Bluth, tenor – Adam
Michael Riskin, soprano – Jacob
SJCO Chorus – Hebrew Chorus
St. Benedict’s Schola and Members of The Choral Project – Angel Choir
The Choral Project – Repentant Nations
Isabell Monk O’Connor – Rivka

Production
Ken Lee – Mastering Engineer 
Myron Dove – Mix Engineer, Editor 
Barbara Day Turner – Executive Producer 
Mona Lyn Reese – Executive Producer 
Barbara Christmann – Producer 
Thomas Hassing – Photography 
Gabriela Martínez, Texto – Art Direction 
Marie Olofsdotter – Cover illustration Choose Life
Recorded by Leslie Ann Jones on The Scoring Stage at Skywalker Sound, assisted by Dann Thompson and Robert Gatley.
Schola recorded by Rockhouse Productions, St. Joseph, MN.

Artistic
Mona Lyn Reese – Composer 
Delores Dufner OSB – Librettist 
Barbara Day Turner – Conductor
Daniel Hughes – Conductor
Teri Larson – Chorus Master
Daniel Hughes – Chorus Master
Keiko Kagawa-Hamilton – Choral Preparation 
Christine Manderfeld, OSB – Schola Conductor 
The San José Chamber Orchestra – Orchestra 
Choristers from The Choral Project, Choral Cosmo, and Prince of Peace Lutheran Church  – Choir
Michael Touchi – Accompanist

References

External links
ChooseLife-Music.com
San José Chamber Orchestra
MonaReese.com

2011 albums
Classical music in the United States
Songs about the Holocaust
Oratorios
Classical music about the Holocaust